Cengiz Tuncer (1942 – 7 December 1992) was a Turkish politician who served as the Minister of Transport in the 46th government and 47th government of Turkey, and one of the Ministers of State in the 48th government. After getting his master's degree in West Germany, Tuncer became one of the founding members of the Motherland Party (ANAP) and entered the Grand National Assembly, after which he became a minister.

Early and personal life 
Born in 1942 in Manavgat, Antalya, Tuncer graduated from the Faculty of Political Science of the Ankara University in 1964. He got his master's degree in West Germany. He was married and had two children. In addition to Turkish and English, he also spoke German.

Career 
Tuncer was one of the founding members of the Motherland Party (ANAP). He entered the Grand National Assembly as an ANAP member in 1983 from the Kayseri district. During his second term in the parliament, he was a member of the Antalya district. He was the Minister of Transport in the 46th (1987–1989) and 47th governments of Turkey (1989–1991). In the 48th government (1991), Tuncer was one of the Ministers of State.

Death 
On 7 December 1992, Tuncer was found dead by his younger son, who had returned from school to their home in Ankara.

References

Citations

Bibliography 

1942 births
1992 deaths
Ankara University alumni
Members of the 17th Parliament of Turkey
Members of the 18th Parliament of Turkey
Ministers of Transport and Infrastructure of Turkey